Adacao is a settlement in the north-east of Guam. It is located on the east coast, 11 miles east of Hagåtña, in the village of Mangilao.

References

Census-designated places in Guam